The Prince's Act is the 17th novel by Belgian writer Amélie Nothomb. It appeared on 20 August 2008 published by Éditions Albin Michel.

Plot
A man steals an unknown person's identity. «There is a moment, between fifteenth and sixteenth sip of champagne, where every man is an aristocrat».

References 

2008 Belgian novels
Novels by Amélie Nothomb
Éditions Albin Michel books